Atympanophrys wawuensis, commonly known as the Wawu horned toad, is a species of frog in the family Megophryidae.
It is endemic to China. It is only known from the type locality, Mount Wawu in Hongya County, Sichuan, which is located to the northwest of Mount Emei.
Its natural habitats are temperate forests, rivers, and intermittent rivers.
It is threatened by habitat loss.

References

Atympanophrys
Amphibians of China
Endemic fauna of Sichuan
Taxonomy articles created by Polbot
Amphibians described in 2001